The Florentine citron – citron hybrid of Florence – is a very fragrant citrus fruit, which is named after its most known origin of cultivation. Its scientific name is Citrus × limonimedica 'Florentina' Lush.

Source and genetics
This variety or hybrid originated in Italian Renaissance gardens. Today it is considered to be a lemon × citron hybrid.

It's known to be one parent of the Bizzaria chimaera.

History and uses

It was first described by Johann Christoph Volkamer in his  Nürnbergische Hesperides, who gave a detailed account for original citrus types, mutations and hybrids, along with professional illustrations. He has many illustrations of the Florentine citron growing by itself, or on the Bizzaria tree. Those illustrations resemble the way it looks today.

He also writes that it has a very pleasant fragrance, similar to the Greek citron.

The most popular Italian variety, namely the Genoese citron, was well respected and praised by Ashkenazic and Sephardic communities.

References

External links

 The Gardeners Dictionary by Philip Miller
 The Complete Distiller by Ambrose Cooper
 The Complete Confectioner
 The Universal Botanist and Nurseryman by Richard Weston
 DioMedia
 Ville Giardini Firenze 

Citron
Citrus
Citrus hybrids
Medicinal plants